Choteč is a municipality and village in Jičín District in the Hradec Králové Region of the Czech Republic. It has about 200 inhabitants.

Notable people
Jan Křtitel Kuchař (1751–1829), musician and composer

References

External links

 

Villages in Jičín District